William North (died 6 March 1855) was an English cricketer. North's batting style is unknown. He was born at Barton in Fabis, Nottinghamshire and was christened there on 13 December 1807.

North made three first-class cricket appearances for Nottingham Cricket Club. All three were against Sheffield Cricket Club, two of which were played at the Forest New Ground in 1827 and 1828 with the other at Darnall New Ground. He scored at total of 39 runs in his three matches at an average of 7.80, with a high score of 27.

He died at Nottingham, Nottinghamshire on 6 March 1855.

References

External links

Date of birth unknown
1855 deaths
People from Rushcliffe (district)
Cricketers from Nottinghamshire
English cricketers
Nottingham Cricket Club cricketers